"Dynamite" is a song recorded by American R&B singer Jermaine Jackson. It was released as the first single from his 1984 album, Jermaine Jackson. An instrumental version of the song, "Tell Me I'm Not Dreamin' (Too Good to Be True)", was released as the B-side.

Personnel
 Jermaine Jackson – lead vocals, backing vocals, drum programming, arrangements
 John Barnes – keyboards, synthesizer bass
 Paul Jackson Jr. – guitar, arrangements
 Jonathan Moffett – drum programming

Charts

Weekly charts

Year-end charts

References

External links
Genius: Dynamite - Lyrics

1984 singles
1984 songs
Jermaine Jackson songs
Songs written by Andy Goldmark
Songs written by Bruce Roberts (singer)